James McGee was the defending champion but chose not to defend his title.

Kevin King won the title after defeating Cameron Norrie 6–4, 6–1 in the final.

Seeds

Draw

Finals

Top half

Bottom half

References
Main Draw
Qualifying Draw

Cary Challenger - Singles
2017 Singles